Rangelov is a surname. Notable people with the surname include:

Bogdan Rangelov (born 1997), Serbian footballer
Dimitar Rangelov (born 1983), Bulgarian footballer
Radoslav Rangelov (born 1985), Bulgarian footballer
Rumen Rangelov (born 1985), Bulgarian footballer

Bulgarian-language surnames